Martín Stefanonni Mazzocco (born April 30, 1964 in Chipilo, Puebla) is a Mexican lawyer and politician.

Born in the small town of Chipilo to Luis Stefanonni Berra and Librada Mazzocco Piloni, Martín and his family relocated to San Miguel de Allende when he was seven years of age, where he grew up and eventually began his political career. A former member of the National Action Party (PAN), Stefanonni served as a deputy in the Chamber of Deputies from 2006 to 2009 and a local deputy in the Congress of Guanajuato. He has since switched parties and is now a member of the recently established Social Encounter Party.

References 

1964 births
Living people
Mexican people of Italian descent
People from San Miguel de Allende
Politicians from Guanajuato
Politicians from Puebla
Members of the Chamber of Deputies (Mexico)
National Action Party (Mexico) politicians
University of Salamanca alumni
21st-century Mexican politicians
Members of the Congress of Guanajuato